Houser Memorial is a public artwork by an unknown artist, located at Rock Creek Cemetery in Washington, D.C., United States. Houser Memorial was originally surveyed as part of the Smithsonian's Inventories of American Painting and Sculpture. The monument is the grave of Helen L. Houser and her daughter Anna Victoria Houser

Description

This grave marker features a granite sculpture of Helen Houser sitting with her daughter Anna Victoria. With her proper right arm around Anna's shoulder, Helen points with her proper left hand to a page in a book resting on Anna's lap. The sculpture sits upon a large rectangular base.

An inscription on the base reads: HOUSER

On the right side of the base:

HELEN L. HOUSER
MAR. 27 1880
AUG. 22 1934

On the left side of the base:

ANNA VICTORIA HOUSER
OCTOBER 31, 1906
JULY 3, 1918

The Houser family

The Houser's were a wealthy Washington family who lived in the Logan Circle neighborhood. They owned various properties in Washington. Anna Victoria Houser was the only child of Helen and Edward Houser. When she died, possibly of influenza, when she was eleven, the Houser's sold their businesses and dedicated their lives to donating and raising funds for charities.

Gallery

References

External links

Helen L. Houser on FindAGrave
Anna Victoria Houser on FindAGrave

Burials at Rock Creek Cemetery
Granite sculptures in Washington, D.C.
Monuments and memorials in Washington, D.C.
Outdoor sculptures in Washington, D.C.
Sculptures of children in the United States
Sculptures of women in Washington, D.C.